is a Japanese football player for Vanraure Hachinohe from 2023.

Career
Onishi begin first youth career with Kindai University in 2009 until he was graduation in 2012.

Onishi begin first professional career with Ehime FC in 2013.

On 30 December 2016, Onishi signed to J3 promoted club, Azul Claro Numazu from Ehime FC.

On 26 December 2018, Onishi joined to J2 promotion club, Kagoshima United FC. He leave from the club in 2022 after four years at Kagoshima.

On 26 December 2022, Onishi announcement officially transfer to J3 club, Vanraure Hachinohe for upcoming 2023 season.

Career statistics
Updated to the end 2022 season.

Club

References

External links
Profile at Azul Claro Numazu
Profile at Ehime FC

1989 births
Living people
Kindai University alumni
Association football people from Osaka Prefecture
Japanese footballers
J2 League players
J3 League players
Ehime FC players
Azul Claro Numazu players
Kagoshima United FC players
Vanraure Hachinohe players
Association football goalkeepers